Cyclopharynx is a small genus of two species of cichlid fish. Both species are endemic to the Fwa River in Democratic Republic of the Congo.

Species
 Cyclopharynx fwae Poll, 1948  
 Cyclopharynx schwetzi (Poll, 1948)

References

Haplochromini

 
Taxa named by Max Poll